Loner is the debut studio album by American duo Missio, released on May 19, 2017 by RCA Records.

Background
The album’s lyrical content is themed around frontman Matthew Brue’s personal struggles and path to sobriety. The album was promoted by three singles: "Middle Fingers", released on March 30, 2017 with a music video, "Everybody Gets High", released on April 28, 2017, and "Bottom of the Deep Blue Sea". “Middle Fingers” was particularly popular, with 44,000 digital downloads, and 3.8 million streams as of 2017. It also appeared on Billboard’s Hot Rock Songs and Alternative Songs charts.

Track listing

Personnel 
Matthew Brue – lead vocals, producer
David Butler – instrumentalist, producer

Charts

References

2017 albums
Missio (duo) albums
RCA Records albums